Tharkot is a mountain of the Kumaon Himalaya in Uttarakhand India. It is situated near the southern rim of Nanda Devi Sanctuary. It is joint 160th highest located entirely within the Uttrakhand. Nanda Devi, is the highest mountain in this category. It lies 7.3 km SSW of Mrigthuni . Devtoli  lies 7.5 km NNE and it is 10.8 km SSE of Trisul I . It lies 7.2 km SW of Maiktoli .

Climbing history
In May–June 1944 Tharkot was first climbed by C.W.F.Noyce and G.Rawlinson. It first came to light when Shipton and Tilman came from the Nanda Devi Sanctuary by climbing down the Sunderdunga col to this valley. The first Indian ascent of Tharkot was by K. P. Sharma's team in 1963. In 1969 Harish Kapadia led a team from Bombay. They met with an avalanche due to that they have to abundant the summit bit.

In 1977 A Japanese team of 29 men and 4 women climbed Tharkot. They approach from the Mrigthuni Glacier make three camps. 24 climbers got to the summit from October 4 to 6.

Neighboring and subsidiary peaks
Neighboring or subsidiary peaks of Tharkot:
 Nanda Devi: 
 Nanda Ghunti: 
 Trisul I 
 Mrigthuni 
 Devtoli:

Glaciers and rivers
Bidalgwar Glacier on the west side of Tharkot and Mrigthuni Glacier, Sukhram Glacier, and Sundardunga Glacier on the eastern side, all the glacier flows from north to south. From the eastern side glaciers comes out Sundardunga river that joins Pindari River near Khati village. Pindari river later joins Alaknanda river at Karnaprayag. Alaknanda River is one of the main tributaries of river Ganga that later joins Bhagirathi River the other main tributaries of river Ganga at Devprayag and became Ganga there after.

See also

 List of Himalayan peaks of Uttarakhand

References

Mountains of Uttarakhand
Six-thousanders of the Himalayas
Geography of Chamoli district